Simpukka-amppeli (1998) is an album by the Finnish rock group Absoluuttinen Nollapiste.

Track listing
 "Silti" (Tommi Liimatta, S. Lyhty) - 3:02
 "Ajoratamaalaus" (Liimatta) - 3:33
 "Sanankeruumatka" (Liimatta) - 3:18
 "Eläimen varmuus" (Liimatta) - 3:05
 "Tapahtua" (Aake Otsala, Liimatta) - 2:21
 "Tämä kun" (Liimatta, Aki Lääkkölä) - 4:22
 "Tämä" (Liimatta) - 2:36
 "Heitto-ovet" (Liimatta) - 3:23
 "Ideakuvasto" (Otsala, Lääkkölä) - 2:32
 "Ennen virhettä" (Liimatta) - 3:40
 "Kaatua" (Otsala) - 3:08
 "Sunnuntai" (Lääkkölä, Liimatta) - 3:49
 "Viittä vaille sadetta" (Liimatta, Lyhty) - 10:09

Personnel

 Tommi Liimatta - vocals, acoustic guitar
 Aki Lääkkölä - guitars, keyboards, accordion
 Aake Otsala - bass guitar, harmonica, vocals
 Tomi Krutsin - drums, percussion
 Teemu Eskelinen - backing vocals

External links
  
  Album entry at band's official website

Absoluuttinen Nollapiste albums
1998 albums